Hieronymous "Hip" Flask is a fictional anthropomorphic hippopotamus  who appears in comic books published by Active Images and Image Comics. He was created by Richard Starkings.

Overview
The character of Hip Flask first appeared in a number of advertisements for Comicraft comic book fonts in the late 1990s in which he was originally depicted as a private detective (this has since changed in the pages of his own comics). The character was created by Starkings when he failed to receive authorization from Marvel or DC Comics to use their characters in his Comicraft ads. He later graduated to his own series of one-shots by writers Richard Starkings, Joe Casey and artist Ladrönn. 

His strip adventures have placed him firmly in the science fiction genre, in a dystopian future (2262). Much of the imagery of Hip Flask's world is reminiscent of the movie Blade Runner, especially as both are set in Los Angeles. The comics have been published once every one or two years, with three issues available as of July 2006. 

A monthly series called Elephantmen was first available for sale in stores in July 2006, published by Image Comics. Set in the same universe, it focuses mainly on other human/animal hybrids, and fleshing out the continuity of the main series, though Hip features as well.

In 2001, the character's similarities with an Australian comic book character called Hairbutt (a bumbling anthropomorphic hippopotamus private detective) led Hairbutt co-creator Bodine Amerikah and Darren Close of OzComics to accuse Hip Flask creator Richard Starkings of plagiarism. Starkings replied that he created Hip Flask without any knowledge of Hairbutt, and that their similarities were a bizarre coincidence.

Fictional character biography 
Some two hundred years from now, the MAPPO Corporation, headed by the misanthropic and megalomaniacal Japanese scientist, Dr. Kazushi Nikken, breeds human/animal hybrids in a secure, top secret facility somewhere in North Africa. The Hybrids are composed of numerous African animal species including Warthogs, Elephants, Camels, Zebras, Rhinos, Hippos, Giraffes, Hyenas, and Crocodiles. The process involves implanting embryos into the wombs of kidnapped local women who are disposed of after giving birth. Each child is branded after birth marking them as the property of MAPPO. Hip Flask's scar is distorted so that "Hippopotomas Hybrid Flask #7A" instead reads just "Hip Flask #7A", hence his name.

These Elephantmen are trained from birth to be soldiers and killers, they are indoctrinated in an Orwellian mindset to think of themselves as property of the MAPPO Corporation and to deny any concept of free thought. Hip Flask was possibly the only Elephantman who dared to ask questions during his childhood education, an act for which he was placed in solitary confinement.

The U.N. upon discovering these experiments sends in an army to storm MAPPO's secret base. While their mission has not been elaborated at this stage it seems to be a combination of liberating the Elephantmen, investigating the attacks on the local populace and ending the development of MAPPO's illegal army.

MAPPO turns the Elephantmen on the U.N. troops, and horrendous casualties are inflicted on both sides. Ultimately the U.N. succeed in subduing the Elephantmen and the MAPPO Personnel are arrested. The Elephantmen are rehabilitated and released to establish their own lives in the outside world where they are generally welcomed with distrust and horror from humans. Many of the Elephantmen were assigned jobs by the government.

The intervening years of Hip Flask's life have not yet been revealed but many years later he appears as an advisor for the Information Agency, a government body tasked with monitoring data and information as an aid to law enforcement. He is partnered by a beautiful young woman named Vanity Case who seems to have romantic feelings towards him (much to Hip's embarrassment). Despite his traumatic childhood Hip Flask is shown to be a calm, kind and friendly individual, unlike many of the other Elephantmen who display a great deal of bitterness.

Other Elephantmen 
So far the series has also introduced a number of other Elephantmen including Casbah Joe, a Camel hybrid (resembling Joe Camel) who runs a floating restaurant/nightclub called the Eye of the Needle, Jeremiah Granger, a Giraffe hybrid and proprietor of the tailor's All Creatures Great and Tall and Ebony, a true Elephant/Man and a colleague of Hip's.

The most famous Elephantman in this world is Obadiah Horn (a rhino hybrid) who has risen in prominence as a businessman, though this may hide more underhanded dealings. He is married to a human named Sahara, daughter of a prominent business rival of Horn's named Serengheti. She is a former member of the U.N. team that rescued the Elephantmen from MAPPO.

References

External links
Hipflask

Fictional hippopotamuses
Fictional detectives
Fictional soldiers
Hip Flask
Hip Flask
Fictional anthropomorphic characters
Dystopian comics
Comics set in the 23rd century
2002 comics debuts
Comics characters introduced in 2002
Fictional people from the 23rd-century